Patryk Brzeziński (born 30 October 1984) is a Polish rower. He competed in the men's eight event at the 2008 Summer Olympics.

References

1984 births
Living people
Polish male rowers
Olympic rowers of Poland
Rowers at the 2008 Summer Olympics
Sportspeople from Poznań